Don Baker (born 26 August 1950) is an Irish blues musician, television personality, and actor.

Baker was born in Whitehall, Dublin. He is a singer-songwriter who plays the harmonica and the guitar. He appeared in several films, his most notable appearance being in In the Name of the Father and On the Nose. He has published harmonica instruction books and videos. 

In August 2008, he appeared in RTÉ's reality show Fáilte Towers, finishing in third place, earning money for his charity Health Action Overseas.

Discography
 Almost Illegal (1989)
 Born With The Blues (1990)
 No Nonsense (1993)
 Four For The Road with Jimmy MacCarthy, Mick Hanly and Finbar Furey, Live on Tour 1994 (1994)
 No Regrets (1996)
 Just Don Baker (1998)
 Miss You (2000)
 Duckin' & Divin''' - 2 CDs (2003)
 Rain On The Wind (2006)
 My Songs My Friends (2013)
 Bakerrose - Don Baker & Clara Rose (2016)
 A Day In Jealoustown - Don Baker & Rob Strong (2018)
 Brothers In Blues - Don Baker & Rob Strong (2018)
 The Blues Man - 2 CDs (2019)

Bibliography
 The Harmonica (1987)
 Complete Harmonica Techniques (1993)
 Beginning Blues Harp (1995) 
 Beginning Rock Harp (1996)
 The Winner in Me: Don Baker's Story (1999) 
 Learn to Play Blues Harmonica (2011)
 Soodlum's Harmonica Pack Famous Harmonica Styles'' (video tape)

References

External links
 Rattlebag Don Baker's conversation with RTÉ's Myles Dungan
 Under the Influence Don Baker in conversation with Joe Jackson

Blues related links
 Beginning Blues Harp with Don Baker DVD 
 Famous Harmonica Styles
 J'Apprends L'Harmonica Blues
 Methode Intégrale des Différentes Techniques de l'Harmonica

1950 births
Living people
Blues harmonica players
20th-century Irish male singers
Irish male singer-songwriters
Musicians from Dublin (city)
Participants in Irish reality television series